The British & Irish Boxing Authority (BIBA) is a professional boxing governing, sanctioning, and licensing organization that operates primarily within the United Kingdom and the Republic of Ireland.

History 
BIBA was launched in April 2016. In September 2019, it was announced that the authority had sanctioned the comeback fight of Nigel Benn, who will take on Sakio Bika in Birmingham on 23 November 2019.

References

External links 
Official site

Boxing in the United Kingdom
Professional boxing organizations
Boxing
2016 establishments in the United Kingdom